The Little River is a  stream and tidal river on Linekin Neck in the town of Boothbay in the U.S. state of Maine. It is a small tidal river for its lower , entering the Atlantic Ocean just west of the mouth of the Damariscotta River.

See also
List of rivers of Maine

References

Rivers of Lincoln County, Maine
Rivers of Maine